Persististrombus is a genus of sea snails, marine gastropod mollusks in the family Strombidae, the true conchs.

Fossil record
Fossils of Persististrombus are found in marine strata from the Oligocene to the Quaternary (age range: from 28.4 to 0.0 million years ago.).  Fossils are known from Europe, North and South America, Algeria, India, Indonesia, Libya, Somalia, Turkey and Iran.

Species
Species within the genus Persististrombus include:
 †Persististrombus lapugyensis-exbonellii
 †Persististrombus aldrichi (Dall, 1890) 
 †Persististrombus baltrae (Garcia-Talavera, 1993) 
 †Persististrombus barrigonensis (Jung & Heitz, 2001) 
 †Persististrombus chipolanus (Dall, 1890) 
 †Persististrombus coronatus (DeFrance, 1827)  
 Persististrombus granulatus (Swainson, 1822) 
 †Persististrombus insulanus (Jung & Heitz, 2001) 
 Persististrombus latus (Gmelin, 1791) 
 †Persististrombus mardieae (Petuch, 2004) 
 †Persististrombus nodosus (S. Borson, 1820) 
 †Persististrombus obliteratus (Hanna, 1926) 
 †Persististrombus radix (Brongniart, 1823) 
 †Persististrombus toroensis (Jung & Heitz, 2001)

Gallery

References

 Biolib

Strombidae